Ashalaja is a town near Amasaman in the Ga West Municipality in the Greater Accra region of Ghana.

References 

Communities in Ghana
Greater Accra Region